Ivo Klec (born 28 November 1980) is a Slovak former tennis player. He played mainly on the ATP Challenger Tour. On the ITF Futures circuit, he has claimed 27 titles, 14 singles and 13 doubles. In addition, he has also won two ATP Challenger doubles titles.

Singles titles

References

External links

1980 births
Living people
Tennis players from Bratislava
Tennis players from Munich
Slovak expatriate sportspeople in Germany
Slovak male tennis players
Tennis controversies
Match fixing in tennis
21st-century Slovak people